Minister for the Arts may refer to:
 Minister for the Arts (Australia)
Minister for the Arts (New South Wales)
Minister for the Arts (Northern Territory)
Minister for the Arts (Western Australia)
 Minister for the Arts (United Kingdom)